Stade Municipal is a multi-use stadium in Daloa, Côte d'Ivoire.  It is currently used mostly for football matches. It serves as a home ground of Réveil Club de Daloa. The stadium holds 4,000 people.

Football venues in Ivory Coast
Buildings and structures in Sassandra-Marahoué District
Sport in Sassandra-Marahoué District
Daloa